Emam Kandi (also Romanized as Emām Kandī) is a village in Beradust Rural District, Sumay-ye Beradust District, Urmia County, West Azerbaijan Province, Iran. At the 2006 census, its population was 77, in 15 families.

References 

Populated places in Urmia County